Liudmyla Pavlivna Suprun (born January 7, 1965 in Zaporizhia) is a Ukrainian politician and former candidate in the 2010 Ukrainian presidential election.

Biography
After graduating from Kyiv University, Suprun worked as an academic researcher till 1992. Since then she worked in the field of agriculture. In 1997 Suprun was recognized as "Business Woman Ukraine 1997".

During the 1998 Ukrainian parliamentary election she was elected into the Ukrainian parliament for constituency #100 in Kirovohrad Oblast where she became a member of the faction of the People's Democratic Party. In 2002 Suprun was re-elected on a Labour Ukraine ticket as part of For United Ukraine. At the parliamentary elections 2006 the People's Democratic Party took part in the alliance "Block of people's democratic parties" (together with the Democratic Union and the Democratic Party of Ukraine) but this alliance did not overcome the 3% threshold (winning only 0.49% of the votes) and therefore no seats. After taking responsibility for the defeat Valeriy Pustovoitenko resigned as leader of the People's Democratic Party. In his place the party was led by Suprun. In the 2007 elections, the People's Democratic Party failed again as part of Election Bloc Liudmyla Suprun - Ukrainian Regional Asset to win parliamentary representation. The current Chairman of the party is still Liudmyla Suprun.

Suprun was a candidate in the 2010 Ukrainian presidential election nominated by People's Democratic Party, during the election she received 0,19% of the votes.

Suprun tried to return to parliament in the 2012 Ukrainian parliamentary election as an independent candidate, single-member district number 101 (first-past-the-post wins a parliament seat) located in Kirovohrad Oblast; but she finished third in this district with 17.1% of the votes.

Suprun did not participate in the 2014 Ukrainian parliamentary election.

In the 2019 Ukrainian parliamentary election Suprun again as an independent candidate tried and failed to win a parliamentary seat in, single-member districts number 198 (first-past-the-post wins a parliament seat) located in Cherkasy Oblast. She finished fourth with 4.32% of the votes.

References

External links

1965 births
Politicians from Zaporizhzhia
Living people
People's Democratic Party (Ukraine) politicians
Third convocation members of the Verkhovna Rada
Fourth convocation members of the Verkhovna Rada
Candidates in the 2010 Ukrainian presidential election
Independent politicians in Ukraine
21st-century Ukrainian women politicians
Laureates of the Honorary Diploma of the Verkhovna Rada of Ukraine
Recipients of the Honorary Diploma of the Cabinet of Ministers of Ukraine
Women members of the Verkhovna Rada